Martin "Marty" Davis (born November 15, 1958) is a former professional tennis player from the United States.

During his career, Davis won four singles titles and four doubles titles. He achieved a career-high singles ranking of world No. 47 in June 1985 and a career-high doubles ranking of world No. 29 in November 1988.

Career finals

Singles: 6 (4 titles, 2 runner-ups)

Doubles: 12 (4 titles, 8 runner-ups)

External links
 
 

American male tennis players
California Golden Bears men's tennis players
UC Santa Barbara Gauchos men's tennis coaches
Sportspeople from San Jose, California
Tennis people from California
1958 births
Living people
American tennis coaches